Year 172 (CLXXII) was a leap year starting on Tuesday (link will display the full calendar) of the Julian calendar. At the time, it was known as the Year of the Consulship of Scipio and Maximus (or, less frequently, year 925 Ab urbe condita). The denomination 172 for this year has been used since the early medieval period, when the Anno Domini calendar era became the prevalent method in Europe for naming years.

Events 
 By place 

 Roman Empire 
 Emperor Marcus Aurelius crosses the Danube with an expeditionary force. He subdues the Marcomanni and their allies and then, in a pact signed with the Germanic tribes, he imports them into the Roman Empire to occupy areas that have been depopulated by the plague.
 The Sarmatians attack the lower Danube frontier.
 Miracle in Moravia: As the Roman army is encircled by the Quadi under intense heat, a violent thunderstorm sweeps away the Quadi in a torrent of water and mud, and refreshes the parched legionaries.
 Avidius Cassius, governor of Syria, suppresses an agrarian revolt in Egypt and is made supreme commander of the Roman army in the East.

 Asia 
 Last (5th) year of Jianning era and start of Xiping era of the Chinese Han Dynasty.
 Battle of Jwawon: Goguryeo Prime Minister Myeongnim Dap-bu defeats the Chinese Han Dynasty forces in Manchuria.

 By topic 

 Religion 
 Tatian produces his Diatessaron, a harmony of the four gospels.
 Montanism spreads through the Roman Empire.

Births 
 Lu Su, Chinese general and politician (d. 217)
 Xu Miao, Chinese official and politician (d. 249)

Deaths 
 Dou Miao (or Huansi), Chinese empress 
 Hou Lan, Chinese eunuch-official and politician
 Marcus Macrinius Vindex, Roman praetorian prefect

References